Trumbert (or Tunberht or Tunbeorht) was a monk of Jarrow, a disciple of Chad and later Bishop of Hexham.

Life

Trumbert was educated at Lastingham by Chad, and was a teacher of Bede.  He was the bishop of the see of Hexham from 681 until he was deposed in 684 and was succeeded by Eata. He had previously been a monk at Ripon under Wilfrid. After his deposition, he became abbot at Gilling Abbey in north Yorkshire. He was the brother of Ceolfrith, who was abbot of Jarrow while Bede was a monk at Jarrow.

Trumbert Shaft
The Trumbert Shaft is part of an inscribed sandstone grave cross found in the parish of Yarm, North Yorkshire in 1877. It bears the inscriptions in Latin and Old English:

Which translates as:

The shaft now resides in the library of Durham Cathedral and it is assumed that Trumbert is buried within the churchyard of Yarm Parish Church.

Notes

References

External links
 

Bishops of Hexham
7th-century English bishops